Pumpkin House, also known as Hart Tenant House, is a historic home in Troy, Rensselaer County, New York.  It was built in about 1820 and is a two-story, three-bay Federal period frame residence with a high pitched gable roof parallel to the street.  It has a large, two-story rear wing built in two stages, in about 1830 and about 1870.  It was restored in the 1990s.

It was listed on the National Register of Historic Places in 1998.

References

Houses on the National Register of Historic Places in New York (state)
Federal architecture in New York (state)
Houses completed in 1820
Houses in Troy, New York
National Register of Historic Places in Troy, New York